Golden Star de Fort-de-France is a football club in Martinique, playing in the town of Fort-de-France.

It plays in Martinique's first division, the Martinique Championnat National.

Golden Star was the first overseas club to win a game in the Coupe de France with its 2–1 win over US Melun in 1974.

Achievements
Martinique Championnat National: 16
 1927, 1928, 1929, 1936, 1937, 1939, 1948, 1952, 1953, 1954, 1956, 1958, 1959, 1962, 1976, 1986

Coupe de la Martinique: 5
 1953, 1957, 1958, 1963, 1970

Ligue des Antilles: 3
 1956, 1958, 1959

Performance in CONCACAF competitions
CONCACAF Champions' Cup: 2 appearances
1985 – Unknown Round (Caribbean) – they passed the First Round
1987 – Second Round (Caribbean) – Lost against  Trintoc FC 1 – 0 on aggregate (stage 2 of 4)

The club in the French football structure
French Cup: 3 appearances
1974/75, 1975/76, 1997/98
Ties won:
1974/75 Golden Star 1–1, 2–1 US Melun (rd 7)

References

External links
 2007/2008 club information at Antilles foot

Football clubs in Martinique
Fort-de-France
Association football clubs established in 1905
1905 establishments in Martinique